This is a detailed list of transactions during the 2005–06 NBA season.

Retirement

Front office movements

Head coach changes 
 Bob Hill became the head coach of the Seattle SuperSonics.
 Isiah Thomas became head coach of the New York Knicks, succeeding Larry Brown.
 Stan Van Gundy resigned as head coach of the Miami Heat. Pat Riley was named interim coach.
 Nate McMillan was named the head coach of the Portland Trail Blazers.
 Terry Stotts was named the new head coach of the Milwaukee Bucks.
 Bob Weiss was named the head coach of the Seattle SuperSonics (now called the Oklahoma City Thunder).

Assistant coach changes 

 Henry Bibby becomes an assistant coach of the 76ers.
 Larry Krystkowiak becomes an assistant coach of the Milwaukee Bucks.
 Gordon Chiesa becomes an assistant coach for the SuperSonics.
 Eric Musselman becomes the head coach of the Kings.
 Randy Wittman becomes an assistant coach for the Timberwolves.
 Henry Bibby becomes an assistant coach for the 76ers.
 Gene Keady becomes an assistant coach for Toronto.
 Scott Adubato becomes an assistant coach of Memphis Grizzlies.
 Randy Wittman, Mark Bryant and Morlon Wiley are named new assistant coaches for the Orlando Magic.
 Chip Engelland is named assistant coach of the San Antonio Spurs.
 Brian James is named assistant coach of the Bucks.

General manager changes 

 Jeff Bower becomes general manager of the Hornets.
 Maury Hanks becomes general manager for the New Jersey Nets (now called Brooklyn Nets).
 Lance Blanks and Chris Grant become assistant general managers of the Cleveland Cavaliers.
Orlando Magic names Dave Twardzik and Otis Smith assistant general managers.
Cleveland Cavaliers hire Danny Ferry as general manager.
Minnesota Timberwolves resign Jim Stack.
 Cleveland Cavaliers name Lance Blanks and Chris Grant assistant general managers.

Team president changes 

 Maurizio Gherardini was named vice president of the Toronto Raptors on June 22, 2005.
 Alex Martins is named executive vice president of the Orlando Magic.

Player movement

Trades

Releases

Free Agency

Draft

1st Round

2nd round

Signed Undrafted Players

Other
Houston Rockets announce Clyde Drexler and Matt Bullard as new television analysts.
 New York Knicks names Roger Hinds athletic trainer.

References

External links 
 NBA Transactions at NBA.com
 2005 Free Agent Tracker at NBA.com
 2005–06 NBA D-League Assignments at NBA.com
 2005-06 NBA Transactions| Basketball-Reference.com
 NBA Trades and Transactions - October 23, 2005 - National Basketball Association - ESPN
  at Basketball.RealGM.com

Transactions
2005-06